Royal Chester Rowing Club is a rowing club based on the Groves in Chester. It rows on the River Dee with both men's and women's squads and members ranging from juniors of 14 upwards to Veteran oarsmen and women.

History
Founded in 1838, the club is one of the oldest in the UK.  It hosts the North of England Head and Chester Long Distance sculls. Royals compete at events around the country, and in 2017 sent two eights to Henley Royal Regatta.

Honours

Henley Royal Regatta

British champions

See also
British Rowing

References

External links
Royal Chester Rowing Club

Rowing clubs in England
Sport in Chester
Sports clubs established in 1838
1838 establishments in England
Rowing clubs of the River Dee